Matías Nahuel Coloca Lavandeira (born 11 September 1985) is an Argentine footballer who plays as a goalkeeper for Salvadoran club Real Destroyer.

Career
Coloca started his senior career with San Lorenzo de Almagro. In 2007, he signed for Deportivo Español in the Argentinean Primera B Metropolitana, where he made twenty-three league appearances and scored zero goals. After that, he played for Club Almagro, Club Atlético Villa San Carlos, Cafetaleros de Chiapas, Sportivo Las Parejas, Deportivo Armenio, Deportivo Achirense, C.D. FAS, C.D. Atlético Marte, Independiente, and C.D. Luis Ángel Firpo, where he now plays.

References

External links
 
 Dear Ascent: Matías Coloca, at the Boca de El Salvador
 Matías Coloca: "You have to leave Mars in first in whatever way it is" 
 "I would take a lightning trip to Argentina for the bills"
 "In Argentina there are also debts" 
 Matías Coloca, FAS goalkeeper: "It will favor us to play in Cuscatlán"

1985 births
Living people
Argentine footballers
Footballers from Buenos Aires
Association football goalkeepers
San Lorenzo de Almagro footballers
La Plata FC footballers
Deportivo Español footballers
Club Almagro players
Club Atlético Villa San Carlos footballers
Altamira F.C. players
Sportivo Las Parejas footballers
Deportivo Armenio footballers
C.D. FAS footballers
C.D. Atlético Marte footballers
C.D. Luis Ángel Firpo footballers
Primera Nacional players
Primera B Metropolitana players
Torneo Argentino A players
Torneo Federal A players
Ascenso MX players
Primera División de Fútbol Profesional players
Argentine expatriate footballers
Expatriate footballers in Mexico
Argentine expatriate sportspeople in Mexico
Expatriate footballers in El Salvador
Argentine expatriate sportspeople in El Salvador